Yokuts, formerly known as Mariposa, is an endangered language spoken in the interior of Northern and Central California in and around the San Joaquin Valley by the Yokuts people. The speakers of Yokuts were severely affected by disease, missionaries, and the Gold Rush. While descendants of Yokuts speakers currently number in the thousands, most of the constituent dialects are now extinct.

The Yawelmani dialect of Valley Yokuts has been a focus of much linguistic research.

Dialects

The Yokuts language consists of half a dozen primary dialects. An estimated forty linguistically distinct groups existed before Euro-American contact. The following classification appears in Whistler & Golla (1986).

Poso Creek
 Palewyami Yokuts (also known as Poso Creek, Altinin)
General Yokuts (all others)
 Buena Vista

Tulamni
 Hometwali
 Nim

Tule–Kaweah
Wukchumni
 Yawdanchi (also known as Nutaa)
 Bokninuwad

Northern Yokuts
Gashowu
 Kings River
Chukaymina (also spelled Chukaimina)
 Michahay
 Ayitcha (also known as Aiticha, Kocheyali)
 Choynimni (also spelled Choinimni)
 Valley Yokuts (see)

Speakers and language revitalization 
Most Yokuts dialects are extinct, as noted above. Those that are still spoken are endangered.

Until recent years, Choinimni, Wikchamni, Chukchansi, Kechayi, Tachi and Yawelmani all had a few fluent speakers and a variable number of partial speakers. Choynimni went extinct in 2017. Wikchamni, Chukchansi, Tachi, and Yawelmani were being taught to at least a few children during the first decade of the twenty-first century.

Chukchansi is now a written language, with its own alphabet developed on a federal grant. Chukchansi also has a phrase book and dictionary that are partially completed. In May 2012, the Linguistics Department of Fresno State University received a $1 million grant to compile a Chuckchansi dictionary and grammar texts, and to "provide support for scholarships, programs, and efforts to assemble native texts and create a curriculum for teaching the language so it can be brought back into social and ritual use."

Genetic relations

Yokutsan is a key member in the proposed Penutian language stock. Some linguists consider most relationships within Penutian to be undemonstrated (cf. Campbell 1997). Others consider a genetic relationship between Yokuts, Utian, Maiduan, Wintuan, and a number of Oregon languages to be definite (cf. DeLancey and Golla 1997). Regardless of higher-order disagreement, Callaghan (1997) provides strong evidence uniting Yokuts and the Utian languages as branches of a Yok-Utian language family.

The term "Delta Yokuts" has recently been introduced in lieu of the longer "Far Northern Valley Yokuts" for the dialect spoken by the people in the present Stockton and Modesto vicinities of San Joaquin and Stanislaus counties, California, prior to their removal to Mission San Jose between 1810 and 1827. Of interest, Delta Yokuts contains a large number of words with no cognates in any of the other dialects, or for that matter in the adjacent Utian languages, although its syntax is typically Northern Valley Yokuts (Kroeber 1959:15-17). This anomaly has led Whistler (cited by Golla 2007:76) to suggest, "The vocabulary distinctive of some of the Delta Yokuts dialects may reflect substratal influence from pre-proto-Yokuts or from an extinct Yok-Utian language." Golla (2007:77) suggests that a "pre-proto-Yokuts" homeland was in the Great Basin, citing a rich plant and animal vocabulary for a dry environment and a close connection between Yokuts basketry styles and those of prehistoric central Nevada.

Proto-language

Proto-Yokuts reconstructions from Whistler and Golla (1986):

{| class="wikitable sortable"
! gloss !! Proto-Yokuts
|-
| acorn || *pʰutʰuʂ
|-
| beaver || *t’ɨːpɨkʰ ~ *ʈ’ɨːpɨkʰ
|-
| blood || *hɨːpa-ʔ
|-
| bone || *c’iy
|-
| child || *witʰip
|-
| child (diminutive) || *wicʰip
|-
| coyote || *kʰay’iw
|-
| eight || *mun’us
|-
| eye || *sasa-ʔ
|-
| fingernail || *xiːsix
|-
| fire || *ʔoʂitʰ
|-
| fish || *lopʰiʈʰ
|-
| flea || *p’aːk’il
|-
| friend || *noːcʰi
|-
| head louse || *tʰihiʈʰ
|-
| heart || *ʔuʂik’
|-
| horn || *ɨʂɨl’
|-
| mountain || *lomitʰ
|-
| mouth || *sama-ʔ
|-
| north || *xosim
|-
| nose || *ʈʰɨŋɨk’
|-
| shaman || *ʔaŋʈʰiw
|-
| skunk || *cʰox
|-
| sky || *ʈʰipʰin
|-
| star || *c’ayatas
|-
| string || *c’ikiy
|-
| tears || *maŋal
|-
| three || *ʂoːpʰin
|-
| two || *poŋiy
|-
| water || *ʔilik’
|}

See also
 Yokuts people

Further reading

References

 
 
 Campbell, Lyle. (1997). American Indian Languages: The Historic Linguistics of Native America. New York, Oxford University Press.
 
 
 Golla, Victor. (1964). Comparative Yokuts Phonology. University of California Publications in Linguistics (No. 34); Studies in Californian Linguistics. Berkeley, CA: University of California Press.
 Golla, Victor. (2007). "Linguistic Prehistory" in California Prehistory: Colonization, Culture, and Complexity, pp. 71–82. Jones, Terry L. and Klar, Kathryn A., editors. New York: Altamira Press. .
 Golla, Victor. (2011). California Indian Languages. Berkeley: University of California Press. .
 
 Kroeber, A. L. (1959). Northern Yokuts. Anthropological Linguistics 1(8):1-19. Bloomington, Indiana.
 Kroeber, A. L. (1963). Yokuts Dialect Survey. University of California Anthropological Records 11(3):177-251. Berkeley.
 Mithun, Marianne. (1999). The Languages of Native North America. Cambridge: Cambridge University Press.  (hbk); .
 Newman, Stanley S. (1944). Yokuts Language of California. Viking Fund Publications in Anthropology No. 2. New York.
 Newman, Stanley S. (1946). The Yawelmani Dialect of Yokuts. Linguistic Structures of Native America, pp. 222–248, C. Osgood, ed., Viking Fund Publications in Anthropology No. 6. New York.
 Powell, John Wesley Powell. (1891). Indian Linguistic Families of America, North of Mexico, Washington: Government Printing Office,  pages 90–91.

External links

 
 Yokuts languages fonts, Languagegeek.com
 Yokuts (Northern Foothill): Lord's prayer
 Chawchila metathesis
 Native Tribes, Groups, Language Families and Dialects of California in 1770  (map after Kroeber)
 Yokuts languages language overview at the Survey of California and Other Indian Languages
 
 

 
Language families
Endangered Yokutsan languages
Indigenous languages of California
Yok-Utian languages